Suzanne Portnoy, (born 1961) is the author of the best-selling explicit memoir The Butcher, The Baker, the Candlestick Maker: An Erotic Memoir (Random House, 2006), The Not-So-Invisible Woman (Random House, 2008) and the play Looser Women, which was performed in 2011 at the Edinburgh Festival.  She has been a publicist for the last twenty years.

The book charts her journey through a sexually liberated youth, largely sexless marriage then divorce and pursuit of a lifestyle of multiple partners, group sex, loss of someone close and being mother to two children.  Parallels can be drawn with The Sexual Life of Catherine M., in the honesty of its approach and its graphic detail.

Suzanne Portnoy lives in northwest London.  She is Jewish.

References

External links
Official website maintained by author
Huffington Post Less Monogamy, More Fun
Huffington Post What Your Parents Don't Know Can Hurt Them
Observer Interview
What's On Stage Blog

English memoirists
1961 births
Living people